= The World, the Flesh and Myself =

- Author: Michael Davidson
- Language: English
- Publication date: 1962
- Pages: 422

The World, the Flesh and Myself is an autobiographical book by Michael Davidson.
